Chareh (also Romanized as Chereh; also known as Chehreh and Chīreh) is a village in Beradust Rural District, Sumay-ye Beradust District, Urmia County, West Azerbaijan Province, Iran. At the 2006 census, its population was 137, in 17 families.

References 

Populated places in Urmia County